Nika C. Elugardo is an American attorney and politician who served as a member of the Massachusetts House of Representatives. She represents Boston and Brookline. Elugardo serves on the House Committee on Technology and Intergovernmental Affairs, the Joint Committee on Children, Families and Persons with Disabilities, the Joint Committee on Elder Affairs, and the Joint Committee on Tourism, Arts and Cultural Development. She is a member of the Massachusetts Black and Latino Legislative Caucus.

Education 
Elugardo earned her Bachelor of Science in Urban Planning from the Massachusetts Institute of Technology, a Master of Public Policy from the John F. Kennedy School of Government, and a Juris Doctor from the Boston University School of Law.

Career 
After graduating from law school, Elugardo worked at the National Consumer Law Center in Boston. Elugardo then served as the Jamaica Plain Liaison and Senior Policy Advisor to Massachusetts State Senator Sonia Chang-Díaz.

In the 2018 election, Elugardo mounted a successful primary challenge to incumbent Representative Jeffrey Sanchez. A political progressive, Elugardo participated in an event hosted by the Boston chapter of the Democratic Socialists of America, where she described herself as a socialist.

See also
 2019–2020 Massachusetts legislature
 2021–2022 Massachusetts legislature

References

External links
 Legislative website
 Campaign website

Living people
21st-century American politicians
Women state legislators in Massachusetts
Democratic Party members of the Massachusetts House of Representatives
MIT School of Architecture and Planning alumni
Boston University School of Law alumni
Harvard Kennedy School alumni
21st-century American women politicians
Hispanic and Latino American state legislators in Massachusetts
Hispanic and Latino American women in politics
People from Jamaica Plain
Politicians from Boston
1973 births